Wyck Godfrey is an American producer and executive. He is best known for producing The Twilight Saga and The Maze Runner film series. He is a partner of the production company Temple Hill Entertainment with his friend Marty Bowen, which they founded in 2006.  In 2017, he was named President of Paramount Motion Pictures Group.  In 2020, Godfrey left Paramount and returned to producing with Temple Hill Entertainment.

Life and career 
Godfrey graduated from Science Hill High School in Johnson City, Tennessee, earned a degree in English literature from Princeton University, and later moved to New York City, where he interned at New Line Cinema. In February 2006, he and his friend Marty Bowen founded their own production company, Temple Hill Entertainment, and produced The Nativity Story as their first film together. He was raised Christian.

Godfrey produced the five films in The Twilight Saga series from 2008 to 2012. In 2014, he produced the young adult novel adaptation The Fault in Our Stars He has also produced the three films in The Maze Runner series.

Filmography 
He was a producer in all films unless otherwise noted.

Film

As an actor

Thanks

Television

Thanks

References

External links 
 

Living people
Film producers from Tennessee
Princeton University alumni
People from Johnson City, Tennessee
Year of birth missing (living people)
Television producers from Tennessee